Pat Sanderson (born 6 September 1977 in Chester) is a former England international rugby union player and a former flanker for Worcester. He is the brother of the former England player Alex Sanderson.
His early rugby union career blossomed at Bury Grammar School, Littleborough RUFC and then at Kirkham Grammar School and included his first international cap for the England 16 Group Schools team. He joined Manchester Sale (now Sale Sharks) in 1996 and was capped by England U21s and England A. He moved to Harlequins where he played in the 2001 Powergen Cup final, when Quins lost to Newcastle by 30–27.

Sanderson was first capped on England's 1998 southern hemisphere tour as a 20-year-old, facing New Zealand twice and South Africa, and he won another three caps on the 2001 tour to North America, during which he scored a try against the United States.

At the end of the 2003–04 season he moved to newly promoted Worcester Warriors, as captain, he was instrumental in ensuring the Warriors remained in the Premiership. He started every Premiership game last in 2004/5 and Sanderson was nominated for Zurich Player of the Season 2004–05 and the PRA Players’ Player of the Year. This consistency resulted in an England recall for the autumn test opener against Australia in November 2005. Despite some impressive performances in the 2005 autumn internationals and being made captain for England's tour to Australia in 2006, he fell out of favour with England when Brian Ashton replaced Andy Robinson as coach in late 2006 and did not featured since.

Sanderson is an established and firm favourite at Worcester Warriors – both of the supporters and the club, and is fondly referred to as 'Captain Fantastic'. He has played over 100 top flight games and scored 22 tries for Worcester and has again being named as club captain for the 2008/09 season by Director of Rugby for Worcester Mike Ruddock.

Sanderson was also a high-calibre sevens player, having made his debut back in 1997 in Hong Kong. In 2003–04 he played in six of the IRB World Series rounds including the three wins in South Africa, Hong Kong and London. He also helped England win the prestigious Hong Kong event. In 2002 he was also a member of England’s Commonwealth Games squad in Manchester.

Sanderson is the Chairman of the Professional Rugby Players’ Association and he is well placed to understand the problems players face, particularly with injuries. A fractured shoulder, two damaged knees and prolapsed disc have all kept him out of the game at different stages. Sanderson is also now the players representative of the This is Rugby campaign, in association with The Professional Rugby Players' Association, Premier Rugby Limited and the RFU, to promote the Core Values of rugby following a spate of disreputable incidents in professional premiership rugby.

Sanderson committed his future to Worcester Warriors on the eve of the 2007/08 season by agreeing a new two-year deal, which would see him remain at Sixways until 2010.

In August 2011, Sanderson was forced to retire from rugby after failing to recover from a shoulder injury.

References

External links
 Worcester Warriors Profile at Warriors.co.uk
 Guinness Premiership Profile at GuinnessPremiership.com

1977 births
Living people
English rugby union players
England international rugby union players
Rugby union players from Chester
Sale Sharks players
Harlequin F.C. players
Worcester Warriors players
People educated at Bury Grammar School
People educated at Kirkham Grammar School
Rugby union flankers
Rugby union number eights